Martin Moormann (born 30 April 2001) is an Austrian professional footballer who plays as a centre-back for Rapid Wien.

Career
Moormann is a youth product of Sierndorf, Horn and AKA St. Pölten, before moving to Rapid Wien in 2018. He began his professional career with their reserves, before debuting for their senior team in a 3–0 Austrian Cup win over Amstetten on 28 October 2021. He signed a professional contract with the club on 11 March 2022, keeping him at the club until June 2025.

International career
Moormann is a youth international for Austria, having represented the Austria U15s, U17s, U18s, and U21s.

Personal life
Moormann is a fan of the English football club Tottenham Hotspur.

Career statistics

References

External links
 
 OEFB Profile

2001 births
Living people
People from Stockerau
Austrian footballers
Austria youth international footballers
SK Rapid Wien players
Austrian Football Bundesliga players
2. Liga (Austria) players
Austrian Regionalliga players
Association football defenders
Footballers from Lower Austria